Tomás Agustín Álvarez (born 8 January 2000) is an Argentine professional footballer who plays as a midfielder for Juan Aurich.

Career
Álvarez is a product of the Godoy Cruz youth system, having joined from the Racing Club equivalent in 2017. Lucas Bernardi promoted the defender into senior action in mid-2019, selecting him to start a Copa Argentina encounter with Huracán on 14 July; he appeared for the full duration as Godoy Cruz progressed on penalties.

In February 2022, Álvarez joined Peruvian club Juan Aurich.

Career statistics
.

References

External links

2000 births
Living people
People from San Luis, Argentina
Argentine footballers
Argentine expatriate footballers
Association football midfielders
Argentine Primera División players
Godoy Cruz Antonio Tomba footballers
Juan Aurich footballers
Argentine expatriate sportspeople in Peru
Expatriate footballers in Peru